Régnard Peaks is a group of rounded, snow-covered peaks probably over , standing  north of Mount Peary on Kyiv Peninsula, on the west coast of Graham Land. They were discovered and named by the French Antarctic Expedition under J.B. Charcot, 1908–10.

References

Mountains of Graham Land
Graham Coast